Suffolk Historic District is a national historic district located at Suffolk, Virginia. The district encompasses 514 contributing buildings, 3 contributing structures, and 3 contributing objects in Suffolk.  The district includes a variety of residential, commercial, governmental, and institutional buildings.  They are in a variety of vernacular and popular 19th and 20th century architectural styles including Greek Revival, Queen Anne, and Bungalow.  Notable buildings include the Allmond Building (1914), Macedonia A.M.E. Church (c. 1870), National Bank of Suffolk (1914-1920), the Old Post Office (c. 1785), old Nansemond County Courthouse (c. 1837), John Granberry house (c. 1795), Richard Seth Eley House (1878), Jones Building (c. 1925), Suffolk Towers, Virginia Apartments (1918-1920), Causey-Kendrick house (1882), Masonic Hall (1911), Suffolk High School (1922), Jefferson High School (1911), old Methodist Church (1861), St. Paul's Episcopal Church (1895), Suffolk Christian Church (1893), and Congregation of Agudath Achin.   Located in the district are the separately listed Phoenix Bank of Nansemond, Professional Building, and Riddick House.

It was added to the National Register of Historic Places in 1987, with boundary increases in 1999, 2002, and 2004.

References

Historic districts on the National Register of Historic Places in Virginia
Greek Revival architecture in Virginia
Queen Anne architecture in Virginia
Buildings and structures in Suffolk, Virginia
National Register of Historic Places in Suffolk, Virginia